Nebojša Šodić (born 15 July 1985) is a Bosnian retired football defender who finished his playing career as player-coach at Sloga 94 Bijeljina.

Club career
He was born in Prijedor, SR Bosnia and Herzegovina, SFR Yugoslavia.  After playing in one of the biggest clubs of Bosnia and Herzegovina, FK Borac Banja Luka, he moved, in January 2007, to Serbia to play in the Serbian SuperLiga club FK Hajduk Kula. In January 2008 he was loaned to FK Mladost Apatin that was playing in the Serbian second tier, the Serbian First League. Since summer 2008 he is back to Bosnia, now playing with FK Rudar Prijedor.

In January 2013, Šodić left Rudar for Zvijezda Gradačac.

References

External links
 
 Profile at Srbijafudbal
 Stats for 2014/15 season at FSRS

1985 births
Living people
People from Prijedor
Association football fullbacks
Bosnia and Herzegovina footballers
FK Rudar Prijedor players
FK Borac Banja Luka players
FK Hajduk Kula players
FK Mladost Apatin players
NK Zvijezda Gradačac players
FK Radnik Bijeljina players
First League of the Republika Srpska players
Premier League of Bosnia and Herzegovina players
Serbian SuperLiga players
Bosnia and Herzegovina expatriate footballers
Expatriate footballers in Serbia
Bosnia and Herzegovina expatriate sportspeople in Serbia